Michael Lekule Laizer (born 24 October 1948) is a Tanzanian CCM politician and Member of Parliament for Longido constituency since 1995.

References

1948 births
Living people
Chama Cha Mapinduzi MPs
Tanzanian MPs 1995–2000
Tanzanian MPs 2000–2005
Tanzanian MPs 2005–2010
Tanzanian MPs 2010–2015